Henry Casimir II of Nassau-Dietz (18 January 1657 – 25 March 1696) was Stadtholder of Friesland and Groningen from 1664 till 1696.

Life
Henry Casimir II of Nassau-Dietz was born in The Hague, the eldest son of Willem Frederik of Nassau-Dietz and Countess Albertine Agnes of Nassau, daughter of Frederick Henry, Prince of Orange, stadtholder of Holland, Zeeland, Utrecht, Guelders, and Overijssel. When his father, a member of the branch of Nassau-Dietz, died in 1664, he was made stadtholder of Friesland and Groningen (under guardianship of his mother as he was then seven years old). In 1675, Friesland voted to make its stadtholdership hereditary in the house of Nassau-Dietz. Hendrik Casimir II was therefore the first Friesian stadtholder. In 1683, he married his cousin Henriëtte Amalia of Anhalt-Dessau, daughter of John George II, Prince of Anhalt-Dessau. Hendrik Casimir died in Leeuwarden, and was succeeded as stadtholder by his son Johan Willem Friso of Orange-Nassau.

Issue 

From his marriage, Henry Casimir II had the following children:
 Willem George Friso (1685–1686), Hereditary Prince of Nassau-Dietz
 Henriette Albertine (1686–1754), Princess of Nassau-Dietz
 Johan Willem Friso (1687–1711), Stadholder in Friesland and Groningen
 Maria Amalia (1689–1771) Princess of Nassau-Dietz
 Sofia Hedwig (1690–1734), married in 1708 Duke Charles Leopold of Mecklenburg (1678–1747), son of Frederick, Duke of Mecklenburg-Grabow
 Isabelle Charlotte (1692–1757), married in 1725 Prince Christian, Prince of Nassau-Dillenburg (1688–1739), son of Henry, Prince of Nassau-Dillenburg
 Johanna Agnes (1693–1765), Princess of Nassau-Dietz
 Louise Leopoldina (1695–1758), Princess of Nassau-Dietz
 Henriette Casimira (1696–1738), Princess of Nassau-Dietz

Ancestors

External links

|-

|-

1657 births
1696 deaths
Dutch stadtholders
Nobility from The Hague
Counts of Nassau
Dutch military personnel of the Nine Years' War
Dutch generals
17th-century Dutch military personnel